Siris is a Palestinian town in the Jenin Governorate in the western area of the West Bank, located 32 kilometers south of Jenin. According to the Palestinian Central Bureau of Statistics, the town had a population of 5400 inhabitants in mid-year 2006. Siris has an area of about 12,495 dunums, including 2,500 dunums of state land, about 7,500 dunums planted with olive trees, about 1,500 dunums of land, and the rest used for construction.

Location
Siris is bordered to the north by the villages of Al-Judeida and  Sir. To the west is the town of Meithalun, to the south is the village of Yassid.

History

Ceramic remains have been found from the Roman era, as well as for the Byzantine era and the early Muslim era.

Siris was one of the stations of ancient Umayyad convoys.

In 1165 a  Crusader text mention an estate name Casalien Ciris, which belonged to a Vitzgraf Ulrich.

It is said that the Muslim leader  Salah al-Din Ayyubi has passed on and taken Siris as headquarters of his forces.

Ottoman era
Siris, like all of Palestine, was incorporated into the Ottoman Empire in 1517.  In the 1596  tax registers,  Siris was part of the nahiya ("subdistrict") of Jabal Sami, part of the larger Sanjak of Nablus. It had a population of 12 households and 3 bachelors, all Muslims. The inhabitants paid a fixed tax rate of 33,3% on agricultural products, including wheat, barley, summer crops,  goats and beehives, in addition to occasional revenues; a total of 2,030  akçe.

In the 19th century the Egyptian leader Ibrahim Pasha passed with his forces through Siris during his conquests in the Levant and lived there after he failed to storm the neighboring village of Sanur.

In 1838,  Edward Robinson noted the village when he travelled in the region, as bordering the extremely fertile Marj Sanur. He listed  it as part of the District of Haritheh, north of Nablus.

In 1870 Victor Guérin  noted the village, surrounded by groves of olives.

In 1882, the PEF's Survey of Western Palestine (SWP)  described  Siris as a small village in the valley, with olives.

British Mandate era
In the  1922 census of Palestine, conducted by the British Mandate authorities,  Siris had 494 Muslims inhabitants,   increasing  in the 1931 census to 608 Muslims, in a total of 123 houses.

In  the 1945 statistics, the population of Siris was 830, all Muslims,  with 12,593 dunams of land, according to an official land and population survey. 1,881 dunams were used for plantations and irrigable land, 2,884  dunams for cereals,  while 19 dunams were built-up (urban) land and 7,809 dunams were classified as "non-cultivable".

Jordanian era
In the wake of the 1948 Arab–Israeli War, and after the 1949 Armistice Agreements, Siris came under Jordanian rule.

The Jordanian census of 1961 found 1,207 inhabitants here.

Post-1967
After the Six-Day War in 1967, Siris has been under Israeli occupation.

References

Bibliography

External links
Welcome To Siris
Siris, Welcome to Palestine
Survey of Western Palestine, Map 11:    IAA, Wikimedia commons

Jenin Governorate
Villages in the West Bank
Municipalities of the State of Palestine